Tando Jam is a town and Municipal Committee of Hyderabad District in the Sindh province of Pakistan. It is located at 25°25'60N 68°31'60E and lies about 12 km away from Hyderabad city Pakistan, along Hyderabad and Mirpurkhas Road.

Populated places in Hyderabad District, Pakistan